Kydex is a line of thermoplastic acrylic-polyvinyl chloride materials manufactured by Sekisui SPI.  It has a wide variety of applications, including for aircraft bulkheads, firearm holsters, and sheaths.

A similar acrylic polyvinyl chloride material (IPK Acrylic-polyvinyl chloride) is manufactured by Emco Plastics and Interstate Plastics, which carries nearly identical properties with an added layer for screen printing. Kydex has become a generic trademark, and often refers to any material of a similar composition.

Development
Kydex sheet was originally produced in 1965 by Rohm and Haas, having been designed for use in aircraft interiors. In 1987, the product line was purchased by Kydex, LLC, formerly Kleerdex Company, LLC, which manufactures the material under the name Sekisui SPI at a location in Bloomsburg, Pennsylvania.  In April 2020, the company was renamed Sekisui Kydex, LLC.

Characteristics
It is an acrylic-polyvinyl chloride composite engineered for thermoforming fabrication, and combines properties of both the acrylic and the polyvinyl chloride components. From acrylic, it obtains rigidity and formability; from PVC, toughness, chemical resistance and good interior finish ratings.
 Flexural modulus is 
 Parts formed from sheet will be rigid and will see moderate deformation when loaded. This is of particular importance in deep formed parts with thin wall sections.
 Relatively hard thermoplastic, with a hardness of 90 on the Rockwell R scale. This hardness, combined with a grained surface, increases its abrasion resistance.
 Low flammability, UL 94 classification V-0

For some applications it is used as replacement for leather, where it has the following advantages:
 Waterproof
 Scratch resistant (Rockwell scale "R" hardness of 90)
 Holds its shape better, and will not stretch or shrink under normal conditions
 Lower friction.

Applications 
 Knife and tool sheaths
 Springs and tensioners
 Firearm holsters
 Seat backs 
 Aircraft pull-down trays 
 Truck fenders 
 Trays and tote boxes 
 DJ booths
 Motor covers 
 Safety helmets 
 Aircraft fairings
 Air exhaust systems
 Rapid prototyping of systems
 Custom insulators for electronic equipment
 Clean rooms 
 Armour for SCA heavy combat
 Telescope tubes
 Autonomous marine vehicles
 Fender for PEVs

References

External links
 

Thermoplastics
Vinyl polymers